Nkourani (or Nkourani ya Sima) is a town located on the island of Grande Comore in the Comoros.

Geography 
The local time zone is named Indian / Comoro with an UTC offset of three hours.

Populated places in Grande Comore